The Fromme-Birney Round Barn near Mullinville, Kansas, United States, is a round barn that was built in 1912. It was built to house draft horses but the horses were eventually replaced by tractors as the years went on. It was listed on the National Register of Historic Places in 1987.

The barn is now owned and operated by the Kiowa County Historical Society and is open daily for visits.

References

External links
 Fromme-Birney "Round" Barn  - Kiowa County Historical Society

Barns on the National Register of Historic Places in Kansas
Buildings and structures completed in 1912
Buildings and structures in Kiowa County, Kansas
Round barns in Kansas
Museums in Kiowa County, Kansas
Agriculture museums in the United States
History museums in Kansas
National Register of Historic Places in Kiowa County, Kansas
1912 establishments in Kansas